Kalgoorlie-Boulder Airport  is an airport in Kalgoorlie, Western Australia. The airport handled 299,055 passengers in the 2021–22 financial year.

The airport is a major hub for fly-in fly-out service due to the mining boom in the region. It is also a hub for the Goldfields Air Services, which offers chartering and flight lessons, along with the Royal Flying Doctor Service, which uses Kalgoorlie as a hub due to the lack of medical assistance for people in the region, transporting major injuries from Kalgoorlie to Perth.

History
Construction and fencing of the Kalgoorlie Aerodrome commenced in 1928, and completed the following year with Royal Australian Air Force landing five Wapiti Jupiter Series aeroplanes in front of large crowds. The aeroplanes were making their way to Perth in preparation for the East-West Air Race.

Ownership of the airport was transferred from the Commonwealth Government to the Shire of Boulder in 1989 with a A$4.2 million grant to construct a new terminal and additional runway space. The new airport opened in November 1992.

The airport hosts a number of daily Perth to Kalgoorlie return flight services. Between November 2007 and November 2008, Skywest Airlines (now known as Virgin Australia Regional Airlines) operated a three times weekly direct service from Kalgoorlie to Melbourne, which failed due to soaring fuel prices and increasing economic uncertainty. Skywest resumed their Kalgoorlie to Melbourne operation in February 2010, with a once a week service.

Prior to May 2014, Qantas operated two flights between Kalgoorlie and Adelaide. In 2020, Virgin Australia suspended their direct flights between Kalgoorlie and Melbourne due to the COVID-19 pandemic.

Airlines and destinations

Operations

See also
 List of airports in Western Australia
 Aviation transport in Australia

References

External links

 Kalgoorlie-Boulder Airport page at City of Kalgoorlie-Boulder website
 
 Airservices Aerodromes & Procedure Charts

Airports in Western Australia
Goldfields-Esperance
City of Kalgoorlie–Boulder